Amador Palma (14 August 1902 – 28 May 1958) was a Spanish athlete. He competed in the men's individual cross country event at the 1924 Summer Olympics.

References

External links
 

1902 births
1958 deaths
Athletes (track and field) at the 1924 Summer Olympics
Spanish male long-distance runners
Olympic athletes of Spain
People from Sestao
Olympic cross country runners
Sportspeople from Biscay
Athletes from the Basque Country (autonomous community)